Drilon Hajrizi (born 17 January 1991) is a Kosovan professional basketball player and he is currently playing with the Trepça of the Kosovo Basketball Superleague.

Professional career

Kanazawa Samuraiz
On 3 January 2018, Hajrizi joined B.League side Kanazawa Samuraiz, on a six-month contract. On 17 January 2018, Kanazawa Samuraiz announced the transfer of Hajrizi via a status on their official Facebook account.

Bashkimi Prizren
On 28 January 2019, Hajrizi joined Kosovo Basketball Superleague side Bashkimi Prizren. On 2 February 2019, he in his debut scored 14 points, 13 rebounds and 5 assists completing the game with double-double in a 75–83 home defeat against Ponte Prizreni.

Return to Peja
On 11 September 2019, Hajrizi returned to Kosovo Basketball Superleague club Peja.

International career
Hajrizi was one of the first players of Kosovo and his official debut with Kosovo came on 31 August 2016 in the EuroBasket 2017 qualification match against Slovenia.

Awards and accomplishments
Prishtina
Kosovo Basketball Superleague: (2017)
Kosovo Cup: (2017)
Peja
2× Kosovo Cup: (2015, 2020)
Kosovo Supercup: (2015)
Trepça
Kosovo Cup: (2022)

References

External links
Drilon Hajrizi at eurobasket.com

1991 births
Living people
Kosovo Albanians
Sportspeople from Mitrovica, Kosovo
Kosovan men's basketball players
Power forwards (basketball)
KB Peja players
KB Prishtina players
Kanazawa Samuraiz players
Bashkimi Prizren players